Shanghai American School (SAS) is an independent, Non-profit international school located in Shanghai, China. Founded in 1912, SAS has two campuses and over 2,800 students enrolled in Pre-K through 12th grade, making it China's largest international school.

The Puxi campus is located in Huacao Town, Minhang District,  and the Pudong campus is located in the Shanghai Links Executive Community in Pudong.

Academics
The school has various signature programs, including Innovation Institute, a two-year interdisciplinary project-based learning program, and Microcampus, a month-long immersion into a small village in China's Yunnan Province. Microcampus and Innovation Institute have both been recognized by hundrED as part of the 100 most innovative education programs in the world.

Both campuses, in Puxi and Pudong, offer Advanced Placement and International Baccalaureate Diplomas, as well as both programs together to high school students.

Activities

Students participate in over 150 clubs, sports, and other activities including the National English Honor Society, National Honor Society, Rho Kappa Honor Society, Model United Nations, International Thespian Society, and Tri-M Music Honor Society.

SAS is a founding member of Asia Pacific Activities Conference (APAC), which comprises some of the largest international schools in Asia. Through APAC, SAS students participate in a variety of intramural recreations, including badminton, volleyball, band, choir, and theater. The school also co-founded the China Cup and Tri-Cities competitions. SAS students also participate in the China International Schools Sports Association (CISSA) League.

History

Early Decades

SAS opened on September 17, 1912, with 38 students and a two-building campus in Shanghai's Hongkou neighborhood, north of the Bund. The school was originally intended to serve "the children of American missionaries and other European residents in the East" but quickly established a reputation for academic excellence, and within a decade, the campus had grown to include twelve buildings on or near North Sichuan Road. With the support of the American business community in Shanghai and abroad, SAS broke ground on a purpose-built campus located amid farmland on the western edge of "Frenchtown" (today's former French Concession).

In 1923, SAS moved to a new campus located on Avenue Petain (now Hengshan Road), whose administration building was modeled after Philadelphia's Independence Hall. (It can still be seen along Hengshan Road; the Girl's Dormitory and Water Tower also remain but are not visible from the road.)

Over the next two decades, SAS's fortunes echoed those of its host city of Shanghai – from the prosperous days of the mid-‘20s and ‘30s to the challenging times of war in 1927, 1932, and 1937.

In 1941, faced with a declining foreign population and with a world war growing in scope, the SAS Board of Managers made the decision to close the school.

Bootleg SAS

Upon hearing of the Board’s decision, a SAS teacher named Frank "Unk" Cheney declared the school must go on. He gathered the remaining faculty, staff, and equipment and continued SAS under a series of different names. He called them "Bootleg SAS."

Bootleg SAS operated out of the SAS campus on Hengshan Road, as well as in the Community Church across the street (still an active church at 53 Hengshan Road). In 1943, Cheney and most of the SAS population were forced into Chapei Civilian Assembly Camp, a Japanese-run internment camp. Still not content to see the school cease operations, Cheney packed thousands of books and brought them to an internment camp so the school could go on. Housed in an open-air shed with rudimentary supplies, the newest iteration of Bootleg SAS nevertheless opened with 222 students. At the end of World War II, the SAS Board of Managers vowed to re-open SAS in the fall of 1946. Unwilling to wait an additional year, Cheney opened yet another Bootleg SAS in the fall of 1945 to serve students until SAS could officially open the following fall.

Post-WWII

At SAS, the period of 1946-49 saw the return of old traditions, sports and arts programs. The school and its campus were even featured in LIFE magazine. But by 1949, with China at the end of the civil war and Shanghai about to be invaded by the Communist Party, the SAS Board of Managers once again made the decision to close the school.

With Unk Cheney no longer on staff, a vice principal named Val Sundt was inspired to invoke the "Spirit of Cheney" and assure the school would once again continue.

Sundt founded the final Bootleg SAS in 1949–50, called Private American School. At the conclusion of the school year in May 1950, Sundt closed the school's doors, and the remaining SAS teachers and students heeded the warnings of the U.S. State Department and departed Shanghai.

The Re-founding

In January 1980, encouraged by the reformist efforts of Chinese leader Deng Xiaoping, the U.S. re-established its Consulate in Shanghai. One of the Consulate's first employees, economics advisor Tom Lauer, brought his wife, Linnea, and three children to Shanghai. Recognizing a need to educate the children of Consulate employees, the U.S. State Department asked Mrs. Lauer to restart Shanghai American School.

SAS re-opened on the U.S. Consulate grounds on Huai Hai Road in September 1980. It remained there until outgrowing the space in 1989.

The Shanghai Girls #3 School, one of Shanghai's most reputable schools, with an alumni list that includes China's famous Soong sisters, agreed to share space with SAS. With a booming foreign population coming into Shanghai, a SAS education was in heavy demand, and in spite of building additional buildings and floors, it was not long before SAS had again outgrown its space.

Pit Stop Campus Era

By the mid-1990s, SAS had decided to build not one but two purpose-built campuses – one on each side of Shanghai's Huangpu River. Before the campus construction could be completed, the school needed to move once again.

Three temporary campuses were established. In Puxi, a semi-built cultural center in Zhudi Town was reassigned to the school. In Pudong, another cultural center – Huaxia – was selected to be SAS’ first presence on the Pudong side of the Huangpu River. A third temporary campus was founded in the Shanghai Centre on Nanjing Road to serve the youngest SAS attendees, though it soon proved unnecessary and closed after just one semester.

Facilities during this time in SAS history were makeshift at best. The school's swim team held competitions at Shanghai's Holiday Inn, and storefronts across from campus served as classrooms. Ignoring the challenges of the times, the school laid plans for a brighter future. SAS became a co-founder of the region's Asia Pacific Athletic Conference (APAC), in spite of having no athletics facilities at the time.

Modern-day SAS

In 1998, the Pudong campus opened on the shores of the East China Sea. In 2000, the Puxi campus opened in the heart of the Minhang district.

In 2004, seven North Koreans climbed over the perimeter wall of the Puxi campus and, thinking that the school was US government property, attempted to claim asylum. The seven North Koreans were later removed by police.

In 2017, James Mikkelson, a veteran English teacher at the Puxi campus, was fired after being found in possession of pornography on his school computer and exchanging explicit messages with former students. He was also the subject of numerous sexual misconduct allegations.

See also 
 List of international schools in Shanghai
 Americans in China

References

External links

 Shanghai American School website
 Profile at the Good Schools Guide International
 Shanghai American School Educational Programs Blog
 SAS Pudong's school profile on Time Out Shanghai Family
 SAS Puxi's school profile on Time Out Shanghai Family

American international schools in China
Educational institutions established in 1912
International schools in Shanghai
International Baccalaureate schools in China
Association of China and Mongolia International Schools
East Asia Regional Council of Overseas Schools
1912 establishments in China
Schools in Pudong